Taking Liberties is a compilation album by English singer-songwriter Elvis Costello, consisting of tracks not previously released on his albums as released in the United States. It is largely made up of B-sides, but features three previously unreleased recordings. It was released only in the US and Canada; its track listing is very similar to that of the UK release Ten Bloody Marys & Ten How's Your Fathers. The differences are that on the latter, the tracks "Night Rally", "Sunday's Best" and "(I Don't Want to Go to) Chelsea" are replaced by "Watching the Detectives", "Radio, Radio" and "(What's So Funny 'Bout) Peace, Love, and Understanding".

The sleeve note by Gregg Geller is very nearly a direct lift from the 1958 album A Gene Vincent Record Date, with Costello's name substituted for Vincent's, and song titles being substituted as appropriate.

The LP version features nostalgic Columbia labels. The legend on the Side One label reads "COSTELLO" instead of "COLUMBIA", in a similar fashion to This Year's Model.

Track listing
All songs written by Elvis Costello except as indicated.

Side one
 "Clean Money" (previously unreleased) – 1:57
 "Girls Talk" (B-side of "I Can't Stand Up For Falling Down", 1980) – 1:56
 "Talking in the Dark" (A-side, 1978) – 1:56
 "Radio Sweetheart" (B-side of "Less Than Zero", 1977) – 2:24
 "Black and White World" (Demo version) (previously unreleased) – 1:51
 "Big Tears" (B-side of "Pump It Up", 1978) – 3:10
 "Just a Memory" (B-side of "New Amsterdam", 1980) – 2:14
 "Night Rally" (from UK version of This Year's Model, 1978) – 2:41
 "Stranger in the House" (A-side, 1978) – 3:01
 "Clowntime Is Over" (Version 2) (B-side of "High Fidelity", 1980) – 3:44

Side two
 "Getting Mighty Crowded" (Van McCoy) (B-side of "High Fidelity", 1980) – 2:05
 "Hoover Factory" (previously unreleased) – 1:43
 "Tiny Steps" (B-side of "Radio, Radio", 1978) – 2:42
 "(I Don't Want to Go to) Chelsea" (from UK version of This Year's Model, 1978) – 3:07
 "Dr Luther's Assistant" (B-side of "New Amsterdam", 1980) – 3:28
 "Sunday's Best" (from UK version of Armed Forces, 1979) – 3:22
 "Crawling to the U.S.A." (from soundtrack to Americathon, 1979) – 2:52
 "Wednesday Week" (B-side of "Talking in the Dark", 1978) – 2:02
 "My Funny Valentine" (Richard Rodgers, Lorenz Hart) (B-side of "Oliver's Army", 1979) – 1:25
 "Ghost Train" (B-side of "New Amsterdam", 1980) – 3:05

Personnel
Elvis Costello – vocals, guitar, keyboards; all instruments on "Black and White World", "Hoover Factory", "My Funny Valentine" and "Ghost Train"
The Attractions 
Steve Nieve – keyboards on all tracks except "Radio Sweetheart", "Black and White World", "Hoover Factory", "Dr. Luther's Assistant", "My Funny Valentine", "Ghost Train" and "Stranger in the House"
Bruce Thomas – bass on all tracks except "Radio Sweetheart", "Black and White World", "Just A Memory", "Hoover Factory", "Dr. Luther's Assistant", "My Funny Valentine", "Ghost Train" and "Stranger in the House"
Pete Thomas – drums on all tracks except "Radio Sweetheart", "Black and White World", "Just A Memory", "Hoover Factory", "My Funny Valentine", "Ghost Train" and "Stranger in the House"
Additional personnel
Dave Edmunds – backing vocal on "Clean Money"
John McFee (Clover) - guitar on "Radio Sweetheart" and "Stranger in the House"
Nick Lowe - bass on "Radio Sweetheart"
 Mickey Shine (Clover) - drums on "Radio Sweetheart" and "Stranger in the House"
Mick Jones - lead guitar on "Big Tears"
Sean Hopper (Clover) – keyboards on "Stranger in the House"
Johnny Ciambotti (Clover) – bass on "Stranger in the House"

Charts

References

External links
 

Albums produced by Elvis Costello
Albums produced by Nick Lowe
B-side compilation albums
Elvis Costello compilation albums
1980 compilation albums
Columbia Records compilation albums